Zhuravlyov is a Russian surname derived from журавль, the Russian word for crane. It may refer to:

 Alexander Zhuravlyov (born 1965), Russian military officer
 Aleksey Zhuravlyov (born 1980), Russian footballer
 Aleksey Zhuravlyov (born 1962), Russian politician
 Boris Zhuravlyov (1946–2019), Russian footballer
 Konstantin Zhuravlyov (born 1976), Uzbekistani sprinter
 Nikita Zhuravlyov (born 1994), Russian footballer
 Oleksandr Zhuravlyov (born 1945), Soviet footballer
 Pavel Zhuravlyov (1887–1920), Russian partisan
 Pavlo Zhuravlyov (born 1983), Ukrainian kickboxer and boxer
 Sergei Zhuravlyov (1892–1937), Soviet Arctic explorer and surveyor
 Sergei Zhuravlyov (born 1976), Russian footballer
 Serhiy Zhuravlyov (born 1959), Ukrainian footballer
 Vsevolod Zhuravlyov (born 1978), Russian footballer
 Yegor Zhuravlyov (born 1990), Russian ice hockey player
 Yevgeny Zhuravlyov (1896-1983), Soviet lieutenant-general in World War II.
 Yuri Zhuravlyov (born 1996), Russian footballer
 Yuri Zhuravlyov (1935-2022), Soviet and Russian mathematician

See also 
Zhuravlev Bay, Severnaya Zemlya, Russia

Russian-language surnames